Note by Note may refer to:

Note by Note cuisine, a cooking style created by Hervé This
Note by Note: The Making of Steinway L1037, a documentary film
Note by Note (album), by Booker T. Jones (2019)